Francis Thomas Murphy (22 April 1928 – 22 November 2012), known as Frank Murphy, was an Australian diver. He competed at the 1952 Summer Olympics and the 1956 Summer Olympics.

References

External links
 
 

1928 births
2012 deaths
Australian male divers
Olympic divers of Australia
Divers at the 1952 Summer Olympics
Divers at the 1956 Summer Olympics
Place of birth missing
Commonwealth Games medallists in diving
Commonwealth Games bronze medallists for Australia
Divers at the 1950 British Empire Games
Medallists at the 1950 British Empire Games